Shangyuan Subdistrict is a subdistrict in Dadong District, Shenyang, Liaoning province, China. , it has 13 residential communities under its administration.
Shangyuan Community
Chenyu Community
Huacheng Community
Gaojiao Community
Qiancao Community
Kangdu Community
Xinhua Community
Shengtaosha Community
Yuanjing Community
Weishi Community
Kuangbei Community
Licheng Community
Dongfang Community

See also 
 List of township-level divisions of Liaoning

References 

Township-level divisions of Liaoning
Shenyang